Cosmocerca is a genus of nematodes belonging to the family Cosmocercidae.

The genus has cosmopolitan distribution.

Species:
 Cosmocerca archeyi
 Cosmocerca australis

References

Nematodes